Soldier is an unincorporated community in Jefferson County, in the U.S. state of Pennsylvania.

History
A post office was established at Soldier in 1899, and remained in operation until 1944. The community takes its name from nearby Soldier Run creek.

References

Unincorporated communities in Jefferson County, Pennsylvania
Unincorporated communities in Pennsylvania